Season by Season Top Goalscorers of club futsal competitions in Iran are listed below.

Top division nationwide league

Province Championship

Premiere League

Super League

See also
 Futsal in Iran
 Iranian Futsal Super League
 List of Iranian Futsal champions
 List of Iranian futsal league winning managers

References 

top goal scorers
Futsal